The Headwater Diversion Plan was an Arab League plan to divert two of the three sources of the Jordan River, and prevent them from flowing into the Sea of Galilee, in order to thwart Israel's plans to use the water of the Hasbani and Banias in its National Water Carrier project for out-of-Basin irrigation. The plan was approved by the Arab League in 1964 but Israel prevented the project's development by conducting airstrikes in Syrian territory in April 1967.

Background
In 1955 the Unified (Johnston) Plan for the multinational development of Jordan River basin between the riparian rights holders was finalized. The Plan was accepted by the technical committees from both Israel and the Arab League. A discussion in the Knesset in July 1955 ended without a vote. The Arab Experts Committee approved the plan in September 1955 and referred it for final approval to the Arab League Council. On 11 October 1955, the Council voted not to ratify the plan, due to the League's opposition to formal recognition of Israel. After the Suez Crisis of 1956 however, the Arab states (with the exception of Jordan) considerably hardened their position against Israel, and now opposed the plan, arguing that by strengthening its economy the plan would increase the potential threat from Israel. The Arab leadership also argued that the increase to Israel's water supply would encourage the immigration of more Jewish settlers, thus reducing the possibility of repatriation for Palestinian refugees of the 1948 war. However, Nasser, the Egyptian president, assured the Americans that the Arabs would not exceed the water quotas prescribed by the Johnston plan

Nevertheless, both Jordan and Israel undertook to operate within the allocations laid out within the "Johnston Plan" . Two civil engineering projects were completed successfully; the diversion of water from the Jordan River (1.7 million cubic metres in a day) at Eshed Kinrot (later dubbed Sapir Pumping Station, located at Tel Kinrot/Tell el-' Oreimeh), carried by the Israeli National Water Carrier from 1955 to 1964 and the Jordanian construction of the East Ghor Canal (now known as the King Abdullah Canal) from 1957 to 1966.

Diversion Plan
After the Suez Crisis in 1956, however, Arab attitudes hardened considerably, and the Arab League, with the exception of Jordan, now actively opposed the Johnston plan, arguing that any plan to strengthen the Israeli economy only increases the potential threat from Israel.  In 1964 when Israel's National Water Carrier was nearing completion, the second Arab League summit conference voted on a plan designed to circumvent and frustrate it. Their resolution stated: 
 The establishment of Israel is the basic threat that the Arab nation in its entirety has agreed to forestall. And since the existence of Israel is a danger that threatens the Arab nation, the diversion of the Jordan waters by it multiplies the dangers to Arab existence. Accordingly, the Arab states have to prepare the plans necessary for dealing with the political, economic and social aspects, so that if necessary results are not achieved, collective Arab military preparations, when they are not completed, will constitute the ultimate practical means for the final liquidation of Israel.

The Arab and North African states chose to divert the Jordan headwaters rather than to use direct military intervention. The heads of State of the Arab League considered two options:
The diversion of the Hasbani to the Litani combined with the diversion of the Banias to the Yarmouk,
The diversion of both the Hasbani and the Banias to the Yarmouk.

The second option was selected. The scheme was only marginally feasible, was technically difficult and expensive. Arab political considerations were cited to justify the diversion scheme. Syria began its part of the overall Arab diversion plan with the construction of the Banias to Yarmouk canal in 1965, with financing from Egypt and Saudi Arabia. Once completed, the diversion of the flow would have transported the water into a dam at Mukhaiba for use by Jordan and Syria and prevent the water from reaching the Sea of Galilee.  Lebanon also started a canal to divert the waters of the Hasbani, whose source is in Lebanon, into the Banias. The Hasbani and Banias diversion works would have had the effect of reducing the capacity of the Israeli carrier from the Sea of Galilee by about 35% and Israel's overall water supply by about 11%. Additionally, it would have increased the salinity of the Sea of Galilee by 60 ppm.

Israeli retaliation

Israel declared that it would regard such diversion as an infringement of its sovereign rights. Israel exploited the DMZ incidents as pretexts for bombing the diversion project, culminating in air strikes deep in Syrian territory in April 1967.

Aftermath
The increase in water-related Arab-Israeli hostility was a major factor leading to the June 1967 Six-Day War.

References

Footnotes

Bibliography
Shlaim, Avi (2000): The Iron Wall; Israel and the Arab World, Penguin Books, 
Shemesh, Moshe (2008): Arab Politics, Palestinian Nationalism and the Six Day War: The Crystallization of Arab Strategy and Nasir's Descent to War, 1957–1967, Sussex Academic Press, 
Kobori, Iwao; Glantz, Michael H. (1998): Central Eurasian Water Crisis: Caspian, Aral, and Dead Seas, United Nations University Press, 
Anthony, Allan John (2001): The Middle East Water Question: Hydropolitics and the Global Economy, I.B.Tauris, 
Murakami, Masahiro (1995): Managing Water for Peace in the Middle East: Alternative Strategies, 

Foreign relations of Israel
National Water Carrier of Israel
Arab League
Abandoned military projects
Arab–Israeli conflict
Israel–Syria relations